Sekhemre Wadjkhaw Sobekemsaf I was a pharaoh of Egypt during the 17th Dynasty in the Second Intermediate Period.

Attestations
Sekhemre Wadjkhaw Sobekemsaf I is known from several monuments.

Medamud
He also extensively restored and decorated the Temple of Monthu at Medamud where a fine relief of this king making an offering before the gods has survived.

Abydos
Sobekemsaf I's son—similarly named Sobekemsaf after his father—is attested in Cairo Statue CG 386 from Abydos which depicts this young prince prominently standing between his father's legs in a way suggesting that he was his father's chosen successor.

Denderah
At Denderah, he is known for a stela mentioning his wife, daughter and son-in-law. Sobekemsaf's chief wife was Queen Nubemhat; she and their daughter (Sobekemheb) are known from a stela of Sobekemheb's husband, a king's son Ameni, son of king's wife Haankhes. His unnamed father might have been  Sekhemre-Heruhirmaat Intef or possibly Senakhtenre Ahmose.

Wadi Hammamat
He is attested by a series of inscriptions mentioning a mining expedition to the rock quarries at Wadi Hammamat in the Eastern Desert during his reign. One of the inscriptions is explicitly dated to his Year 7.

Position within the 17th dynasty

After the Intef kings

Aidan Dodson dates Sekhemre Wadjkhaw Sobekemsaf's reign after those of Djehuti and Sekhemre-Wepmaat Intef. First he remarks that Sobekemsaf's canopic chest is slightly larger—4.1 cm longer and 3.4 cm higher—than the canopic chests belonging to the latter two kings. He also points to the fact that the inscriptions on Sekhemre Wadjkhaw Sobekemsaf's box were "written vertically, rather than in the horizontal arrangement found on those of Djehuti and Sekhemre Wepmaet [Intef]."

The Danish Egyptologist Kim Ryholt similarly dated Sobekemsaf I's reign after those of Sekhmre-Wepmaat Intef and Nubkheperre Intef. First, he remarked that a "king's son Antefmose" (or Intefmose) is praised by a king Sobekemsaf for his role during a festival of Sokar on statuette BM EA 13329. But according to Ryholt "in any case the name Antefmose is basilophorous" and so the king Sobekemsaf who praised him must have been a successor" of the Intef kings, "to one of whom the name (Antefmose) refers." Furthermore, since Sekhemre Wadjkhaw Sobekemsaf I's son and presumable successor was also named Sobekemsaf rather than Intef, Ryholt concluded that this king must have ruled after the Intef kings.

Secondly, Ryholt suggested that Sobekemsaf Wadjkaw ruled after Nubkheperre Intef because while the former ruler carried out extensive restoration works at the temple of Monthu at Medamud, "there is no trace" of Nubkheperre Intef there. For Ryholt, this "may suggest that this temple was restored and put into service again only after Sekhemre Wadjkhaw Sobekemsaf reign". Consequently, Ryholt concluded that Sekhemre Wadjkhaw Sobekemsaf ruled after Nubkheperre Intef and should be numbered as Sobekemsaf II.

Before the Intef kings
At the opposite end, Daniel Polz, who rediscovered Nubkheperre Intef's tomb at Dra Abu el Naga' in 2001, argues that Nubkheperre Intef ruled very late in the 17th dynasty. This means that Sekhemre Wadjkhaw Sobekemsaf could not have reigned between the Intef line of kings and the final three 17th dynasty Ahmoside family of kings (Senakhtenre, Seqenenre and Kamose). From inscriptions found on a doorjamb discovered in the remains of a 17th Dynasty temple at Gebel Antef on the Luxor-Farshut road, it is known today that Nubkheperre Intef and, by implication, his brother and immediate predecessor on the throne —Sekhemre-Wepmaat Intef— were sons of one of the two Sobekemsaf kings. This king was most likely Sekhemre Shedtawy Sobekemsaf II since Sekhemre Wadjkhaw Sobekemsaf's son was also named Sobekemsaf. Ryholt's interpretation of the lineage here has also been accepted by the British Egyptologist Aidan Dodson.

Polz also accepts this view but he placed Nubkheperre Intef just prior to the three final Ahmoside kings of the 17th dynasty in his 2003 book. Since then, he has inserted Sekhemre-Heruhirmaat Intef as a short-lived successor of Nubkheperre before Senakhtenre but his hypothesis remains essentially the same: Polz maintains that Sekemre Wadjkhaw Sobekemsaf I was the father of Sekhemre Shedtawy Sobekemsaf. Indeed, this king's son is known from the statue at Abydos to have also held the name Sobekemsaf and is designated as this king's successor on the same statue. Polz states that this is the most plausible reconstruction of the relationship between the two kings with the name Sobekemsaf in the 17th dynasty. Hence, Sekhemre Shedtawy Sobekemsaf would be Sobekemsaf II —Sobekemsaf I's son and successor— while Sekhemre-Wepmaat Intef and Nubkheperre Intef would be grandsons of Sekhemre Wadjkhaw Sobekemsaf I. This ultimately implies that Sekhemre Wadjkhaw Sobekemsaf ruled early in the 17th dynasty, before the Intef kings and that he must be numbered Sobekemsaf I.

Polz's hypothesis and placement of Nubkheperre Intef as one of the last kings in the Sobekemsaf-Intef family line is also supported "by the evidence of the box of Minemhat, who was governor of Coptos" in Year 3 of Nubkheperre Intef. This box "was part of the funerary equipment of an Hornakht (formerly known as 'Aqhor' in the past literature) who lived under Seqenenre." While no one knows precisely when Hornakht died, the fact that his funerary equipment contained a box which belonged to Minemhat suggests that Nubkheperre Intef and Seqenenre Tao ruled closely in time and that their reigns should not be separated by the intrusion of various other long lived kings of the 17th dynasty such as Sekhemre Wajdkhaw Sobekemsaf I who is attested by a Year 7 inscription. As the late Middle Kingdom German Egyptologist Detlef Franke (1952–2007) succinctly wrote in a journal article which was published in 2008—a year after his death:
Contrary to Ryholt, I see no place for a king Sobekemsaf who ruled after Nubkheperra Antef. Nubkheperra Antef (c.1560 BC) is the best attested (from Abydos to Edfu, e.g. BM 631, EA 1645, coffin 6652) and [the] most important of the three Antefs.

In addition, Polz argued that Ryholt's rejection of the evidence in Cairo Statue CG 386—which named king Sekhemre Wadjkhaw Sobekemsaf's son as another Sobekemsaf—in not giving any indication of the sequence of the known 17th dynasty Theban rulers is untenable. While Ryholt acknowledges in his 1997 book on the Second Intermediate Period that Anthony Spalinger suggested the prince Sobekemsaf who is attested in "a statue from Abydos (Cairo CG 386)" and "has the additional title of prophet, may be identical with Sobkemsaf II Sekhemreshedtawy", Ryholt simply writes that:
this identification is not possible with the [i.e., my] present arrangement of the two Sobkemsaf kings according to which one Sobkemsaf, Sekhemreshedtawy, ruled before to the Antef group [of kings] and the other, Sekhemrewadjkhaw, after them.

Polz notes that although Sekhemre Wadjkhaw Sobekemsaf ruled in a time during the Second Intermediate Period when few documentary sources exist, one cannot simply accept Ryholt's theory that Sekhemre Wadjkhaw Sobekemsaf I's son and designated successor did not succeed his own father as the next king merely because Ryholt's hypothesis did not allow another Sobekemsaf to follow Sekhemre Wadjkhaw Sobekemsaf on the throne due to his theory of the succession of 17th dynasty kings as being: Sekhemre-Shedtawy Sobekemsaf->Sekhemre-Wepmaat Intef->Nubkheperre Intef->Sekhemre-Heruhirmaat Intef->Sekhemre Wadjkhaw Sobekemsaf->Senakhtenre->etc. Indeed, Polz stresses rather that it is more logical to view Sekhemre Wadjkhaw Sobekemsaf I as a predecessor of the Intef line of kings instead; his known son, the Prince Sobekemsaf on Cairo Statue CG 386, would then be the future king Sekhemre Shedtawy Sobekemsaf II and father of two of the three Intef kings: Sekhemre-Wepmaat Intef and Nubkheperre Intef based on a doorjamb found on the Luxor-Farsut road in 1992-93 (the doorjamb mentions a king Sobekem[saf] as the father of Nubkheperre Intef--[Nubkheperre] Antef/[Intef] begotten of Sobekem...—but this king must be king Sobekemsaf II since Sobekemsaf Wadjkhaw Sobekemsaf's son was named Sobekemsaf based on Cairo Statue CG 386).

Polz's critique of Ryholt's view on Intefmose
Daniel Polz also rejected Ryholt's arguments that the praise which a certain king Sobekemsaf lavished onto a king's son named Antefmose or Intefmose on statuette BM EA 13329 has any chronological implications regarding the temporal position of this king after the Intef kings. Polz writes that Ryholt's so-called Point 3:

is implicitly assuming that persons with the name Intef formed on the name of two (or three) kings of that name at the time of the 17th Dynasty can be related, yet [this] completely ignores the fact that these kings themselves chose their own names in conscious style of the same kings of the early 11th dynasty - including even assuming additional names such as ("the Great") as [in the case of] Wep-maat Intef. Ryholt's argument on this point do not make sense. Even if one assumes that the prince [named Intefmose] followed one of the Intef 17th Dynasty kings and he was hence a contemporary of the successor of this [Intef] ruler, [this is] but an interpretation that the Prince was honoured at the statue of a ruling king Sobekemsaf - only then would Ryholt's argument with regards to the 17th Dynasty ruler sequence prove meaningful. In contrast, if the [Intefmose] statuette and, therefore, the Prince was chronologically younger than the Intef-kings, and a successor of king Sobekemsaf was recognized, a worship of the prince by a king Sobekemsaf says nothing about the temporal position of the latter [pharaoh] and thus [of] the succession of the [17th dynasty] rulers of that time.

Burial
The "burial equipment of Sobekemsaf W[adjkhaw] does not contain his prenomen, but can nevertheless be assigned with certainty to this king" since the tomb of Sobekemsaf Shedtawy "was thoroughly robbed in antiquity" by tomb robbers as recorded in Papyrus Abbott III 1-7. On this basis, Kim Ryholt assigns a large heart-scarab, "which was, and indeed still is, set in a large gold mount" containing the name of 'Sobekemsaf' to Sekhemre Wadjkhau Sobekemsaf I here since the tomb robbers would not overlook such a large object on the mummy of the king if it came from Sobekemsaf II's tomb. For much the same reason, a wooden canopic chest also bearing the name 'Sobekemsaf' on it has also been attributed to this king by Ryholt and Aidan Dodson. In contrast to the extensive damage that might have been expected had the chest been in the burned and looted tomb of Sobekemsaf II, "the damage suffered by Cat. 26 (i.e., Sobekemsaf I's chest) is minor, consistent with what it might have suffered at the hands of Qurnawi dealers."

References

 

16th-century BC Pharaohs
Pharaohs of the Seventeenth Dynasty of Egypt